The Prince George's County Delegation refers to the delegates who are elected from districts in Prince George's County, Maryland to serve in the Maryland House of Delegates.

Authority and responsibilities
The Delegation is responsible for representing the interests, needs and concerns of the citizens of Prince George's County in the Maryland General Assembly.

Current members

Notes

See also
 Current members of the Maryland State Senate

References

External links
 Maryland General Assembly

Delegations in the Maryland General Assembly
Prince George's County, Maryland